Clan MacDonnell of Glengarry is a Scottish clan and is a branch of the larger Clan Donald. The clan takes its name from Glen Garry where the river Garry runs eastwards through Loch Garry to join the Great Glen about 16 miles (25 km) north of Fort William, Highland.

History

Origins of the clan 

Glengarry is in Lochaber which was part of the ancient Kingdom of Moray that was ruled by the Picts. Ranald was the son of John of Islay, Lord of the Isles, and Ranald himself had five sons. One of them was Alan, the progenitor of the Clan Macdonald of Clanranald and another was Donald. Donald married twice: firstly Laleve, daughter of the chief of Clan MacIver, by whom he had one son named John. Donald married secondly a daughter of the chief of the Clan Fraser of Lovat by whom he had two more sons, Alexander and Angus. The first son, John, died without heirs and was therefore succeeded by his half-brother Alexander. Alexander is sometimes considered the first true chief of Glengarry but is usually regarded as the fourth.

15th and 16th centuries 

Glengarry did not play an important part in the politics of Clan Donald until the late fifteenth century. Traditional rights of the chiefs were being replaced with feudal relationships in which the Crown was the ultimate superior, as part of the royal policy to pacify the Scottish Highlands. Most of the chiefs submitted to James V of Scotland and even the Clan Macdonald of Clanranald accepted charters in 1494. However Alexander of Glengarry did not receive a charter, suggesting that he continued to have a rebellious attitude at this time. Finally in 1531 he submitted to royal authority and was pardoned for past offences. He received a Crown charter on 9 March 1539 for the lands of Glengarry, Morar, half the lands of Loch Alsh, Lochcarron, Loch Broom and also Strome Castle. This did not stop Alexander following Donald Gorm Macdonald of Sleat in trying to reclaim the Lordship of the Isles. Donald Gorm was killed attacking Eilean Donan Castle and the rebellion collapsed.

Subsequently, Alexander of Glengarry was amongst the island chiefs who were tricked into meeting James V at Portree and was imprisoned at Edinburgh where he remained until the king died in 1542. Glengarry himself died in 1590. His son was Angus who was politically astute and used the influence of his father-in-law, the chief of Clan Grant, to gain a charter from James VI of Scotland, regaining his ancestral estates in 1574.

In a bond of manrent, dated 1571, between Angus MacAlester of Glengarry and Clan Grant, Glengarry makes an exception in favour "of ye auctoritie of our soverane and his Chief of Clanranald only ". This is held by Clanranald of Moydart as an acknowledgment by Glengarry of the Captain of Clanranald as his chief.

17th century 

The Battle of Morar was fought in 1602 between the Clan MacDonell of Glengarry and Clan Mackenzie. Angus was succeeded by Donald, 8th chief, who is reputed to have lived for over one hundred years. Invited in 1626 by Lord Ochiltree, the Lord Chancellor of Scotland to discuss Royal policy for the Western Isles, he disagreed with the proposals and was imprisoned for a time. Despite this, in March 1627 he obtained a charter under the great seal that erected Glengarry into a free barony.

When the 1638-1652 Wars of the Three Kingdoms began, Donald was too old for active campaigning and leadership passed to his son, Aeneas, later 9th chief. He served under James Graham, 1st Marquis of Montrose throughout his 1644-1645 campaign and protected him after the Battle of Philiphaugh. Aeneas forfeited his estates when Scotland was incorporated into the 1653 to 1659 Protectorate. They were returned after the 1660 Restoration and he received the title Lord Macdonell and Aros.

When James II & VII was expelled in the 1688 Revolution, the Glengarry MacDonells were among the 2% of Scots who remained Catholics. Ranald acted as head of the Catholic Jacobite faction and during the 1689 Rising, the Scots Parliament confiscated his lands, although he continued to hold Invergarry Castle. By late 1691, Invergarry was closely besieged and the Scottish government was determined to 'make an example' of the Macdonells. However, after agreeing to pardon Ranald, they switched targets to the Glencoe MacDonalds, which resulted in the Glencoe Massacre.

18th century to modern day

Glengarry took part in the Jacobite rising of 1715 and fought at the Battle of Sheriffmuir. When Ailean Dearg, the Chief of Clan Macdonald of Clanranald was mortally wounded, Alasdair Dubh, 11th of Glengarry rallied the faltering warriors of Clan Donald by throwing up his blue bonnet and crying Buillean an-diugh, tuiream a-màireach! ("Blows today, mourning tomorrow!"); in 1716, Prince James Francis Edward Stuart made him Lord Macdonell in the Jacobite peerage. Following Alasdair Dubh's death (c. 1721 or 1724), he was eulogized in the song-poem Alistair à Gleanna Garadh by his kinswoman Sìleas na Ceapaich, which hearkens back to the mythological poetry attributed to Amergin Glúingel and which remains an iconic and oft imitated work of Scottish Gaelic literature. General Wade's report on the Highlands in 1724, estimated the clan strength at 800 men.

Glengarry's Regiment served throughout the 1745 Rising, initially led by Aeneas, Glengarry's second son; he was accidentally shot dead after Falkirk and replaced by his kinsman Lochgarry who commanded at the Battle of Culloden. His elder brother Alastair Ruadh, later 13th Chief of Glengarry, was captured in November 1745 by a Royal Navy frigate while travelling from France to join the Rising. Imprisoned in the Tower of London, he was released in 1747 and at some point became a Hanoverian mole inside the Jacobite Movement, with devastating results. While his motivations are still disputed, Scottish historian Andrew Lang confirmed in 1747 that Alistair Ruadh was in fact 'Pickle the Spy'.

The Highland Clearances of the early 19th century forced the majority of Clan MacDonell of Glengarry into exile; most settled in Glengarry County, Ontario and parts of Nova Scotia. The most systematic evictions were ordered by the 15th chief, Alexander Ranaldson MacDonell of Glengarry, who was allegedly the model for the haughty and flamboyant Scottish clan chief Fergus MacIvor in Walter Scott's 1814 novel, Waverley. In June 1815, Glengarry formed the Society of True Highlanders, a rival to the Celtic Society of Edinburgh; he was closely involved in arguments over precedence before, during, and after George IV's visit to Scotland in 1822. The occasion is best remembered for popularising the idea of tartans and Highland dress.

His kinsman Fr. Alexander MacDonell (1762–1840) became a Catholic priest in Lochaber. In 1794, during the French Revolutionary Wars, Fr. Macdonnell became the first Catholic military chaplain in post-Reformation British military history after helping to raise the Glengarry Fencibles, which was disbanded in 1804. Father MacDonell accompanied his clansmen to Glengarry County, Ontario, where he helped resurrect the regiment for active service in the War of 1812. In 1826, he was appointed first Bishop of the local Diocese of Kingston.

Castles
Invergarry Castle which is situated on the Raven's Rock was the seat of the Chief of Clan MacDonell of Glengarry.
Strome Castle was also the previous seat of the MacDonells of Glengarry until 1602.

The current and 24th Glengarry is Colin Patrick MacDonell.

References

Sources
 
 
 
 
Clans and Tartans – Collins Pocket Reference, George Way of Plean and Romilly Squire, Harper Collins, Glasgow 1995 
The King's Jaunt, John Prebble, Birlinn Limited, Edinburgh 2000,

External links 
http://www.clandonald-heritage.com
The Glengarry Branch of the Macdonalds
Clan MacDonell of Glengarry

Clan MacDonald of Glengarry
Scottish clans